The Medalha de Mérito Militar (Medal of Military Merit), is a Portuguese military medal created on 28 May 1946. This medal is an award to individuals with exceptional military qualities and virtues. The  'Military Merit Medal'  may also be awarded to foreign military personnel.

Classes 
The medal of military merit comprises:
 The Grand Cross of the Military Merit Medal (GCMM) that can only be awarded to General Officers;
 The remaining classes of the military merit medal may be awarded to military personnel who hold the following rank or rank:
 Class 1 (MPMM) - General officer, colonel or sea captain;
 Class 2( MSMM) - Lieutenant colonel, captain of frigate, major or captain-lieutenant;
 Class 3 (MTMM) - Captain, first lieutenant, other officers of lower rank and sergeant-major;
 Class 4 (MQMM) - Other sergeants and enlisted ranks.

See also
Honorific orders of Portugal

References

External links
 List of the Grand Collar of Freedom

Orders of chivalry of Portugal
 
Orders of chivalry awarded to heads of state, consorts and sovereign family members